Shavil-e Sadeq Khan (also Romanized as Shavīl-e Şādeq Khān; also known as Shavīl) is a village in Qalkhani Rural District, Gahvareh District, Dalahu County, Kermanshah Province, Iran. At the 2006 census, its population was 179, in 41 families.

References 

Populated places in Dalahu County